Papá a la deriva (English: Dad Adrift) is a Chilean telenovela created by Daniella Castagno, that premiered on Mega on May 25, 2015, and ended on February 29, 2016.

Plot 
The story follows the life of Bruno Montt (Gonzalo Valenzuela), a Navy captain with four children. He is strict and fearless. The plot starts from the day that one of his son's, Cristóbal Montt (Simón Pesutic), arrives in Valparaíso. He's greeted by his three siblings who have all been up to trouble at school recently. That same day, Bruno gets a call from the school principal (Paulina Hunt) saying that the children have done terrible things at school. His son Arturo (Nahuel Cantillano) uploaded naked photos of his teachers. His daughter Esmeralda (Li Fridman) bribed a teacher to get out of physical education. Finally, his daughter Marina (Giulia Inostroza) robbed her teacher's makeup.

Things get even worse for Bruno, his children are very mischievous and the only person who had been taking care of the house and keeping things in order was the butler Eugenio Padilla (Claudio Arredondo). One day, Bruno goes out and leaves Eugenio in charge of the house, but seeing as he can't manage the kids on his own he calls his daughter Violeta (María Gracia Omegna). She works on a boat at the Muelle Prat port, she lost her house in the 2014 fires in Valparaíso. Violeta will make the captain a better person by telling him that rules were meant to be broken, and not necessarily to be followed. Bruno is attracted to Violeta from the start, however she has a jealous boyfriend Matías (Ignacio Achurra), the waiter at the restaurant "El Bote Salvavidas" ("The lifesaving boat" in English).

However, the captain's secretary, Rosario (Francisca Imboden) tries to distance Bruno from Violeta and would do anything to get money and satisfy her and her daughter Barbara's needs (Francisca Walker).

Bruno has to learn that his rank as captain won't help him control his children and he has to understand that only through love can he overcome his problems.

Cast 
Gonzalo Valenzuela as Bruno Montt
María Gracia Omegna as Violeta Padilla
Francisca Imboden as Rosario Quevedo
Maricarmen Arrigorriaga as Berta Bonfante
Solange Lackington as Victoria "Vicky" Urrutia
Fernando Larraín as Miguel Ayala
Claudio Arredondo as Eugenio "Queno" Padilla
Ignacio Achurra as Matías Quiroz
Simón Pesutic as Cristóbal Montt
Fernanda Ramírez as Camila Quiroz
Francisco Dañobeitia as Felipe Briceño
Francisca Walker as Bárbara "Barbie" González
Renato Jofré as Diego Quiroz
Li Fridman as Esmeralda Montt
Constanza Mackenna as Mary Ann Chamberline
Nahuel Cantillano as Arturo Montt
Giulia Inostroza as Marina Montt
Jacqueline Boudon as Lucía
Paulina Hunt as Directora del Colegio
Roberto Prieto as Lucho "El Leyenda"

Ratings

References

External links 
 

2015 telenovelas
Chilean telenovelas
Mega (Chilean TV channel) telenovelas
2015 Chilean television series debuts
2016 Chilean television series endings
Spanish-language telenovelas